Wacklin is a surname. Notable people with the surname include:

Isak Wacklin (1720–1758), Finnish painter
Sara Wacklin (1790–1846), Swedish-speaking Finnish educator and writer

See also
Macklin (surname)